The 1930 Western State Teachers Hilltoppers football team represented Western State Teachers College (later renamed Western Michigan University) as an independent during the 1930 college football season.  In their second season under head coach Mike Gary, the Hilltoppers compiled a 5–1–1 record and outscored their opponents, 192 to 25. Halfback Clarence Frendt was the team captain.

Schedule

References

Western State Teachers
Western Michigan Broncos football seasons
Western State Teachers Hilltoppers football